A fuel tax (also known as a petrol, gasoline or gas tax,  or as a fuel duty) is an excise tax imposed on the sale of fuel. In most countries the fuel tax is imposed on fuels which are intended for transportation. Fuels used to power agricultural vehicles, and/or home heating oil which is similar to diesel are taxed at a different, usually lower rate. The fuel tax receipts are often dedicated or hypothecated to transportation projects so that the fuel tax is considered by many a user fee. In other countries, the fuel tax is a source of general revenue. Sometimes, the fuel tax is used as an ecotax, to promote ecological sustainability. Fuel taxes are often considered by government agencies such as the Internal Revenue Service as regressive taxes.

Role in energy policy

Taxes on transportation fuels have been advocated as a way to reduce pollution and the possibility of global warming and conserve energy.  Placing higher taxes on fossil fuels makes petrol just as expensive as other fuels such as natural gas, biodiesel or electric batteries, at a cost to the consumer in the form of inflation as transportation costs rise to transport goods all over the country.

Proponents advocate that automobiles should pay for the roads they use and argue that the user tax should not be applied to mass transit projects.

The Intergovernmental Panel on Climate Change, the International Energy Agency, the International Monetary Fund, and the World Bank have called on governments to increase gasoline tax rates in order to combat the social and environmental costs of gasoline consumption.

Tax rates
International pump prices for diesel and gasoline are tracked by several websites, including Bloomberg L.P. Price differences mostly reflect differences in tax policy.

A Nature study has shown that while gasoline taxes have increased in more countries than they have decreased in during the period 2003–2015, the global mean gasoline tax has decreased due to greater consumption in the low tax countries.

Asia

China
Chinese gasoline taxes have increased the most among the top twenty -emitting countries over the period 2003–2015.

In China, fuel tax has been a very contentious issue. Efforts by the State Council to institute a fuel tax in order to finance the National Trunk Highway System have run into strong opposition from the National People's Congress, largely out of concern for its impact on farmers.  This has been one of the uncommon instances in which the legislature has asserted its authority.

Hong Kong 
The following is a list of fuel tax rates for different fuels in Hong Kong:
Aviation fuel: HK$6.51
Light diesel oil: HK$2.89
Leaded petrol: HK$6.82
Unleaded petrol: HK$6.06
Ultra low sulphur diesel: HK$2.89
Euro V diesel: HK$0

Singapore 
The following is a list of fuel tax rates for different fuels in Singapore:
98 Octane and above petrol: S$0.79 per litre
92 to 95 Octane petrol: S$0.66 per litre

India
In India, the pricing of fuel varies by state, though central taxes still are part of the pump price of fuel. The Central and state government's taxes make up nearly half of petrol's pump price. The Central govt has different taxes, which amount to about 10–20% of the final cost. The states taxes vary, but on average end up making about 17–20% of the final cost. As a result, approximately 50% - 60% of the pump cost goes to the government in the form of different taxes.

Out of this  go to Central Govt of India in the form of excise and customs tax.  is collected by state government in the form of sales tax and entry tax.

Israel
In Israel, tax on fuel is 1.35 USD per liter which includes direct fuel tax and VAT. This totals to 78% of total pump price.

Europe
Kerosene tax can be levied throughout the European Union on domestic flights and between Member States according to the 2003 Energy Taxation Directive.

France
As of 2017, the excise tax on gasoline was €0.651 per liter (regional prices varied from €0.407 to €0.6682). With a VAT rate of 20%, the percent of the total price of gasoline that came from taxes was 63.9% The excise tax on diesel fuel was €0.531 per liter (€0.5307 to €0.5631). With the 20% VAT, 59.3% of the total cost of diesel fuel was taxes.

Petroleum products destined for utilisation by aircraft engaged in commercial flights outside of the customs territory of continental France are exempt from all customs duties and domestic taxes. Recently, a rise of 23% in the diesel fuel tax has caused serious protests in major cities of France, leaving disruption and damage behind them. Before the protests, the French government expected to increase both the petrol and diesel taxes until they both reached €0.78 per liter in 2022.

Germany
Fuel taxes in Germany are €0.4704 per litre for ultra-low sulphur Diesel and €0.6545 per litre for conventional unleaded petrol, plus Value Added Tax (19%) on the fuel itself and the Fuel Tax.

Netherlands
The sale of fuels in the Netherlands is levied with an excise tax. As of 2015, petrol excise tax is EUR0.766 per litre and diesel excise tax is EUR0.482 per litre, while LPG excise tax is EUR0.185 per litre. On top of that is 21% VAT over the entire fuel price, making the Dutch taxes one of the highest in the world. In total, taxes account for 68.84% of the total price of petrol and 56.55% of the total price of diesel. A 1995 excise was raised by Dutch gulden 25 cents (€0.11), the Kok Quarter (€0.08 raise per litre gasoline and €0.03 raise per litre diesel), by then Prime-Minister Wim Kok is now specifically set aside by the second Balkenende cabinet for use in road creation and road and public transport maintenance.

Norway
Motor fuel is taxed with both a road use tax and a CO2-tax. The road use tax on petrol is NOK 4.62 per litre and the CO2-tax on petrol is NOK 0.88 per litre. The road use tax on auto diesel is NOK 3.62 per litre mineral oil and NOK 1.81 per litre bio diesel. The CO2-tax on mineral oil is NOK 0.59 per litre.

Poland
In Poland half of the end-user price charged at a petrol station goes towards 3 distinct taxes:
 akcyza (meaning excise)
 opłata paliwowa (meaning fuel tax)
 Value-added tax "VAT" at 23% (from summary of akcyza and opłata paliwowa, and the price of petrol)
Excise and fuel tax are prescribed by European Commission law, and therefore cannot be lower in any EU nation. However it is even higher than this EU minimum in Poland, a policy pursued by the former Minister of finance.

Russia
Tax on mineral resource extraction (2008–2009):
Oil: varies 1000 RUR/t – 13800 RUR/t; middle MRET 3000 RUR/t (0.058 €/l = 0.284 $/gal).
Natural gas: 147 RUR/1000m³ (4 €/1000m³).
Petroleum gas: no

Excise tax on motor fuel 2008–2009:
RON >80: 3629 RUR/t. (0.071 €/l = 0.343 $/US gal)
RON <=80: 2657 RUR/t. (0.052 €/l = 0.251 $/US

Other fuel (like avia gasoline, jet fuel, heavy oils, natural gas and autogas) prices has no excise tax.

Value Added Tax — 18% on fuel and taxes.

Full tax rate is near 55% of motor fuel prices (ministry of industry and energy facts 2006).

Sweden
The fuel tax in Sweden comprises a carbon tax and an energy tax.

United Kingdom

Value Added Tax at 20% is also charged on the price of the fuel and on the duty. An additional vehicle excise duty, depending on a vehicle's theoretical  production per kilometre, which is applied regardless of the amount of fuel actually consumed, is also levied.

Diesel for use by farmers and construction vehicles is coloured red (Red Diesel) and has a much reduced tax, currently .

Jet fuel used for international aviation attracts no duty, and no VAT.

North America

Canada

Fuel taxes in Canada can vary greatly between locales. On average, about one-third of the total price of gas at the pump is tax. Excise taxes on gasoline and diesel are collected both federal and provincial governments, as well as by some select municipalities (Montreal, Vancouver, and Victoria); with combined excise taxes varying from 16.2 ¢/L (73.6 ¢/imperial gal)) in the Yukon to 30.5 ¢/L ($1.386/imperial gal) in Vancouver. As well, the federal government and some provincial governments (Newfoundland and Labrador, Nova Scotia, and Quebec) collect sales tax (GST and PST) on top of the retail price and the excise taxes.

United States

The first U.S. state to enact a gas tax was Oregon in 1919. The states of Colorado, North Dakota, and New Mexico followed shortly thereafter. By 1929, all existing 48 states had enacted some sort of gas tax. Today, fuel taxes in the United States vary by state.

The state and local tax figures includes fixed-per-gallon taxes as well as variable-rate taxes such as those levied as a percentage of the sales price.  For state-level fuel taxes, nineteen states and the District of Columbia levy variable-rate taxes of some kind. The other thirty one states do not tie the per-gallon tax rate to inflation, gas prices, or other factors, and the rate changes only by legislation. As of July 2016, twenty one states had gone ten years or more without an increase in their per-gallon gasoline tax rate.

Because the fuel tax is universally styled as a "road use" tax, exempting off-road farming, marine, etc. use; states impose a tax on commercial operators traveling through their state as if the fuel used was bought there, wherever the fuel is purchased. While most commercial truck drivers have an agent to handle the required paperwork: what's reported is how much tax was collected in each state, how much should have been paid to each state, the net tax for each state and the combined net tax for all states to be paid by or refunded to the operator by their base jurisdiction where they file. The operator carries paperwork proving compliance. The member jurisdictions, the US states and the CA provinces, transmit the return information to each other and settle their net tax balances with each other either by a single transmittal through a clearinghouse set up by the IFTA and operated by Morgan Stanley, or by separate transfers with the other member jurisdictions.

Oceania

Australia
The fuel tax system in Australia is very similar to Canada in terms of featuring both a fixed and a variable tax, but varies in the case of exemptions including tax credits and certain excise free fuel.

Since October 2018, the fuel tax in Australia is A$0.412 per litre for petrol and ultra-low sulphur diesel (conventional diesel being taxed at A$0.412 per litre) and the excise for LPG is $0.282 per litre. Since 2000, there is also the GST (goods and services tax) on top of the fuel tax and inflation calculated twice a year called CPI (consumer price index) into the fuel tax since 2015.

New Zealand
Fuel taxes in New Zealand are considered an excise applied by the New Zealand Customs Service on shipments brought into the country. A breakdown of the fuel taxes is published by the Ministry of Economic Development. Excise as at 1 August 2012 totals 50.524 cents per litre (NZ  on petrol. The ethanol component of bio blended petrol currently attracts no excise duty. This was to be reviewed in 2012. Diesel is not taxed at the pump, but road users with vehicles over 3.5 tonne in Gross Laden Weight and any vehicles not powered wholly by any combination of petrol, LPG or CNG must pay the Road User Charge instead. The Goods and Services Tax (15%) is then applied to the combined total of the value of the commodity and the various taxes. On 25 July 2007 the Minister of Transport Annette King announced that from 1 July 2008 all fuel excise collected would be hypothecated to the National Land Transport Programme.

Africa

South Africa
South Africa imposes a fuel tax, in Dec 2020, per (unleaded 93 octane, inland) liter, composed of the Fuel Levy – R3,37, Road Accident Fund levy – R1,93, associated costs – R3,12, and the Basic Fuel Price – R5,81 for a total of R14.23. (R = South African Rand (ZAR) ~ R15 per US$ in Dec 2020)

See also
 Carbon fee and dividend
 Carbon tax
 Fuel taxes and rising oil prices – how the taxes of various countries could be used to mitigate the rise in oil prices since 2003
 Excise tax
 Vehicle miles traveled tax
 International Fuel Tax Agreement

References

External links
 International Fuel Prices 2009 with diesel and gasoline prices of 172 countries and information on fuel taxation for state financing
 2012 NACS Retail Fuels Report
 Actual taxes on Unleaded and diesel Fuels in Europe
 Fuel Price in Gurgoan India

 
Environmental tax
Petroleum products
Energy economics
Transport economics
Vehicle taxes